The Iraq national football team represents Iraq in international football and is controlled by the Iraq Football Association (IFA), the governing body for football in Iraq. Iraq's usual home venue is the Basra International Stadium.

Iraq have made one FIFA World Cup appearance in 1986, scoring their only goal against Belgium. They are one of eight current AFC nations to have won the AFC Asian Cup, claiming the title in 2007 in spite of difficult conditions and limited preparation. Iraq defeated some of the favourites in the competition including Australia, South Korea and Saudi Arabia. This qualified them for the 2009 FIFA Confederations Cup where they earned two points in the group stage, and they later finished fourth at the 2015 AFC Asian Cup.

Iraq's team is known for its passionate football fans and the national team is also seen as a symbol of hope and unity for Iraqi people. The team reached an all-time high of 39th in the FIFA World Rankings in October 2004. Iraq are the current holders of the Arabian Gulf Cup, having won the title as hosts in 2023.

History

Early years

As early as 1923, an Iraqi team known as Baghdad XI, controlled by the Baghdad Football Association, started to play matches against British Army teams.  The Baghdad FA soon disbanded and it was not until 8 October 1948 that the Iraq Football Association was founded. The Iraq FA joined FIFA in 1950 and on 2 May 1951, Iraq played their first match: a 1–1 draw to a team named Basra XI.

Iraq's first ever official international game came in the opening game of the 1957 Pan Arab Games in Beirut where Iraq drew 3–3 to Morocco with goals from Ammo Baba, Youra Eshaya (both from Iraq's  Assyrian minority) and Fakhri Mohammed Salman. One of the members of Iraq's first national team was Youra Eshaya, who in 1954 became the first Iraqi footballer to play abroad and in Europe for English Football League side Bristol Rovers.

In 1962, Iraq appointed their first foreign manager, Romanian coach Cornel Drăgușin. Iraq won their first trophy in 1964 when they won the Arab Cup, winning three and drawing one of their four games. In the following edition, they retained their Arab Cup title, beating Syria 2–1 in the final in Baghdad.

1970s
In 1972, Iraq played at their first ever AFC Asian Cup but failed to win a game in the tournament. In March 1973, Iraq played their first ever FIFA World Cup qualifying campaign. They finished second in their group, a point behind Australia, therefore failing to qualify for the next round. In the remaining years of the 1970s, Iraq reached the second round of the Asian Games (1974), lost the Arabian Gulf Cup final (1976), finished fourth at the AFC Asian Cup (1976), finished fourth in the Asian Games (1978) and finally hosted and won the Arabian Gulf Cup (1979). The 1976 Asian Cup would be the last Asian Cup that Iraq appeared in for the next 20 years, as they withdrew from the next four editions.

1980s – First Golden Generation
The 1980s was arguably Iraq's most successful period in their history. They started the decade off disappointingly, being knocked out in the first round of qualifiers for the 1982 FIFA World Cup. In 1982, they won the gold medal at the 1982 Asian Games. In 1984, Iraq won the Arabian Gulf Cup. The following year, they won the 1985 Arab Cup and also won the gold medal at the 1985 Pan Arab Games.

1986 FIFA World Cup
Iraq were seeded into the first round of qualifiers where they faced Qatar and Jordan. Iraq topped Group 1B with 6 points, and advanced to the second round. Iraq faced United Arab Emirates in two legs. Iraq defeated UAE 3–2 in Dubai.
Iraq lost with 2–1 to UAE in the second leg. Iraq won 4–4 aggregate on away goals and advanced to the final round. In the final round, Iraq tied Syria 0–0 in Damascus. Iraq defeated Syria 3–1 in the second leg in Taif. Iraq won 3–1 on aggregate and qualified to the 1986 FIFA World Cup

At their first game of the Group B at the 1986 FIFA World Cup, Iraq played well against Paraguay, losing narrowly 1–0 despite scoring a goal that was controversially disallowed by the referee. Iraq recorded their first World Cup goal in the second game, scoring against Belgium in a 1–2 defeat despite having ten men, with Ahmed Radhi scoring a goal for Iraq. Iraq played against hosts Mexico in the third game, losing 1–0 and being eliminated from the World Cup.

In the following years, Iraq won the 1988 Arabian Gulf Cup and won the 1988 Arab Cup. Overall, Iraq won nine competitions in the 1980s and played in their only World Cup, leading many to believe that this was the golden era of Iraqi football. In 1989, Iraq competed in qualifying for a berth in the 1990 World Cup finals, but they lost a crucial game against Qatar.

1990s – The Dark Era
Following the Gulf War in 1990, Iraq was banned from participating in the Asian Games and in most Arab competitions, leading them to participate in friendly competitions instead.

In 1993, Iraq participated in qualifiers for the 1994 FIFA World Cup and reached the final round but finished fourth in the group, missing out on a World Cup spot by two points. By drawing their last game with Japan 2–2, they denied the Japanese a place in the finals in a match referred to by the Japanese media as the Agony of Doha.

Iraq participated in the 1996 AFC Asian Cup, their first Asian Cup campaign for 20 years of withdrawing from the previous four. They reached the quarter-finals but lost to the United Arab Emirates due to a golden goal scored by Abdulrahman Ibrahim. In 1996, Iraq was ranked 139th in the world, which is their worst FIFA ranking in their history due to inactivity after withdrawing from several tournaments.

In 1997, Iraq participated in qualifiers for the 1998 FIFA World Cup but were knocked out at the first round following two defeats by Kazakhstan.

This period is known as 'The Dark Era' as Uday Hussein, the son of Saddam Hussein, abused his control of Iraqi football and tortured players who played poorly, punishing them by sending them to prison, making them bathe in raw sewage and kick concrete balls, and shaving their heads among many other punishments.

2000s – Second Golden Generation
The 2000s was widely considered to be the rebirth and rise of one of Iraq's greatest football generation second only to the 1980s generation.

However, Iraq had a rocky beginning. It played in the 2000 AFC Asian Cup but were knocked out at the quarter-final stage again, this time by Japan in a 4–1 loss. Iraq reached the second round of 2002 FIFA World Cup qualification but lost five of their eight second-round games and therefore failed to make the finals. Iraq won their first ever WAFF Championship in 2002, beating Jordan 3–2 in the final after extra time despite being two goals down.

In 2004, Iraq once again reached the quarter-finals of the AFC Asian Cup before getting knocked out by China. In the same year they were knocked out at the second round of 2006 FIFA World Cup qualifiers by Uzbekistan.

Iraq were ranked as high as 39th in the World Rankings in October 2004 which is their highest ranking position in their history. The following year, Iraq won the gold medal in the West Asian Games by beating Syria in the final via a penalty shootout. In 2007, Iraq were knocked out at the group stage of the Arabian Gulf Cup. The exit from the Gulf Cup happened in very controversial circumstances as Iraq attempted to make an agreement with Saudi Arabia to draw the final game which would put both teams through to the next round; the Iraq manager Akram Salman told the Iraqi players not to win the game but the Saudi Arabian players were unaware of any agreement and went on to win the game and knock Iraq out of the cup. 
Akram Salman was sacked and Jorvan Vieira appointed as head coach. Under him, Iraq reached the final of the WAFF Championship but lost 2–1 to Iran.

2007 AFC Asian Cup triumph

In July 2007, Iraq kicked off their 2007 AFC Asian Cup campaign. The squad was made mainly of players that had finished fourth at the 2004 Olympic Games and finished second at the 2006 Asian Games. Vieira only had two months to prepare his team for the tournament, and the team suffered from very poor facilities. The Iraq FA struggled to provide the team with enough kits for the tournament and Iraq had not been able to play any previous games in their own country for security reasons and most of the players had had family members killed in the war.

The team started the tournament with a 1–1 draw against joint-hosts Thailand before producing a 3–1 win over favourites Australia. A draw with Oman followed to put Iraq into the quarter-finals where two goals from Younis Mahmoud against Vietnam put Iraq into the semi-finals for the second time in their history. They manages to knock out one of the best Asian teams, South Korea in the semis via a penalty shootout in which Noor Sabri made a crucial save. After the game, a suicide bomber killed 30 football fans who were celebrating the semi-final win over South Korea and this almost led to the Iraqi team withdrawing from the final, but they decided to go on in honour of the dead and succeeded in doing that after defeating Saudi Arabia 1–0 in the final, a game that they dominated from start to finish and that was won by a Younis Mahmoud header. This tournament win is seen as one of the greatest upsets in international history as a war-torn country became international champions in what is described as one of sport's greatest 'fairytales'.

Asian Cup aftermath
Vieira stated during the final that he would resign after the Asian Cup. He was replaced by Egil Olsen in September 2007. Under Olsen, Iraq advanced to the third round of World Cup qualifiers, but after a 1–1 draw with China, the FA sacked Olsen and replaced him with Adnan Hamad.
Iraq failed to advance to the final round of 2010 FIFA World Cup qualifiers as a 1–0 defeat to Qatar saw them finish in third in the group. Following this, the Iraq FA decided to disband the team and sacked Hamad.

Jorvan Vieira was reappointed in September 2008. After a disappointing 2009 Arabian Gulf Cup, Vieira was sacked and replaced by Bora Milutinovic.

2009 FIFA Confederations Cup
In 2009, Iraq participated in only their second FIFA tournament ever: the 2009 FIFA Confederations Cup, which they qualified for by winning the 2007 AFC Asian Cup. They started the tournament with a 0–0 draw with hosts South Africa, before losing 1–0 to UEFA Euro 2008 winners Spain. Iraq drew the last game 0–0 with New Zealand and were knocked out.

On 20 November 2009, the FIFA Emergency Committee suspended the Iraq FA due to government interference; the suspension was lifted on 19 March 2010.

2010s – Ups and downs

In the 2011 AFC Asian Cup, Iraq reached the quarter finals, as they lost 1–0 to Australia. The match went into extra time with Harry Kewell heading in a goal in the 117th minute just inside the 18-yard box. In the 2014 FIFA World Cup qualification, Iraq topped the group in the third round but finished bottom of their group in the final round.

On the last matchday, Iraq qualified for the 2015 AFC Asian Cup by beating China 3–1. 
In the 2015 AFC Asian Cup, Iraq defeated Iran in the quarter-finals in penalties, 7–6, after the game ended 3–3 after 120 minutes of play. They faced South Korea in the semi-finals but lost 0–2 and failed to progress to the final. Iraq finished the AFC Asian Cup in fourth place, after losing 2–3 to United Arab Emirates in third place match.

Four years later, Iraq finished fifth in the final round of the 2018 FIFA World Cup qualification.

On 3 September 2018, Srečko Katanec was appointed as head coach on a three-year contract. Under Katanec, Iraq reached the round of 16 of the 2019 AFC Asian Cup as they lost 1–0 to eventual champions Qatar.

2020s 
Iraq reached the final round of 2022 FIFA World Cup qualification with five wins from eight matches including a 2–1 victory against Iran. Iraq went 19 consecutive matches without losing between 2019 and 2021 and moved up from 89th to 68th in the FIFA rankings during Katanec's tenure. Katanec departed in July 2021 after six months of unpaid wages and filed a complaint with FIFA.

On 31 July 2021, Dutchman Dick Advocaat was appointed head coach of Iraq. Under Advocaat, Iraq made to a slow start to the third round of World Cup Qualifiers, drawing four games and losing two, and on 21 November 2021, Advocaat resigned. Željko Petrović took charge of the team for the 2021 FIFA Arab Cup, where Iraq were eliminated from the group stage. Petrović was sacked after two further winless qualifying games and Abdul-Ghani Shahad was appointed as an interim manager, but Iraq were eliminated after finishing fourth in the group.

On 7 November 2022, Jesús Casas was appointed head coach of Iraq to lead the national team in the 2023 AFC Asian Cup and 2026 FIFA World Cup qualification. In the first tournament under Casas' leadership, Iraq hosted and won the 25th Arabian Gulf Cup, beating Oman 3–2 after extra time in the final.

Team image

Kit

The Iraqi national football team kit has previously been manufactured by brands such as Adidas, Puma, Nike, Diadora, Jack & Jones, Lotto, Peak, Givova and Umbro. Its current kit supplier is Jako.

Kit suppliers

Nickname

The Iraqi team is commonly known as Usood Al-Rafidain, meaning "Lions of Mesopotamia". In ancient Mesopotamia, the Babylonian lion was a symbol of power, impetuosity, ferocity, prestige and dominance. This is reflected in the sculpted lions in Babylon, where the processional path is ornamented with ceramic tile bas-reliefs representing a prestigious lion from the time of Nebuchadnezzar II. This kind of representation aimed to glorify the king, master of the beasts, and also represent the defeat of the enemy. Moreover, the Chaldean royal inscriptions depict the king as a ferocious lion to whom nothing can be resisted. The presence of lions in ancient Iraqi civilization was based on the belief, or desire, that the animals represented would bring with them the virtues they symbolized, so that they could be transmitted to the owners.

Team logo
Iraq kits throughout history have usually featured the flag of Iraq on them, although the coat of arms of Iraq (in part or full) and the Iraq Football Association logo have both appeared on kits in the past. The national team has occasionally had its own unique logo, the first of which was in 1983. This logo was based on the Iraq flag, with Iraqi written at the top of the crest. A new logo appeared on the national team's shirts during the 7th Arabian Gulf Cup in 1988, featuring a vertical flag in a new shape. From 2000 to 2002, the national team's logo featured a green outline with the word Iraq written at the top in green Arabic text. In the 2005 West Asian Games, the team wore a new logo with the red band of the flag appearing in a large semi-circle shape, and in 2007, Iraq briefly reverted to using the logo that they had used from 2000 to 2002. On 23 October 2020, the national team's current logo was revealed, with a star featuring above the crest to commemorate the nation's 2007 AFC Asian Cup victory.

Rivalries

Due to geographical location, Iraq maintains strong rivalries with many neighbours.

Iraq's main and traditional rival has been Iran, and they are often considered to be two of the greatest football teams in the Middle East and Asia with one of the greatest rivalries. At the early stage, Iran had proved to be more dominant than Iraq, remaining undefeated from 1964 until 1993. In the contemporary era, especially during the reign of Saddam Hussein, the two countries had bad relations and fought the Iran–Iraq War for eight years. Iraqis have considered any matches against Iran as a must-win encounter and are known to treat it differently from any other football matches. Iraq has played 31 matches against Iran with 6 victories, 7 draws, and 18 losses.

Iraq's other rival is Saudi Arabia, and matches between the two teams also draw significant attention from Iraqi fans, with Iraq and Saudi Arabia being recognised as the two most successful Arab teams in Asia. The beginnings of the footballing rivalry between them dates back to the 1970s, but it was only after the 1990s that the rivalry between the two Arab nations truly developed since it was previously overshadowed by Iraq's rivalries with Iran and Kuwait. One of these reasons for the rivalry to develop is due to the bitter Gulf War, where Iraq fought against Saudi Arabia over Kuwait, an ally of Saudi Arabia. These encounters have also been marred with various controversies and hostilities, such as the 21st Arabian Gulf Cup hosting rights, where Iraq was stripped from hosting with the tournament instead being moved to Bahrain, a move which was believed by Iraqis as a deliberate act by Saudi Arabia to remove Iraq's home advantage. Before that, Iraq was also banned from hosting home games against Saudi Arabia due to the Gulf War. Iraq has played 40 matches against Saudi Arabia with 18 victories, 11 draws, and 11 losses

Iraq's rivalry with Kuwait was once considered the greatest football rivalry in the Middle East, until being taken over by Iraq's rivalry with Saudi Arabia due to Kuwait's decline. The rivalry began in the mid-1970s. Because of the Gulf War, Iraq and Kuwait were in complete avoidance and never met for more than 15 years until 2005. Iraq has played 37 matches against Kuwait with 17 victories, 10 draws, and 10 losses.

Supporters

Iraq national team supporters are known for chanting "O Victorious Baghdad" ("منصورة يا بغداد") or "With our souls and our blood, we will redeem you, O Iraq" ("بالروح بالدم نفديك يا عراق") during the Iraqi team's matches.

Another famous chant is "the first goal is coming" ("هسه يجي الاول") which is chanted in the beginning of the match. A succeeding chant is "the second goal is coming" ("هسه يجي الثاني"); this is usually chanted repeatedly after Iraq score a goal to motivate the players to score another.

Home matches in Iraq

Currently, Iraq primarily play their home matches in Basra or Baghdad, and use other various stadiums around Iraq. Since 1980, FIFA imposed bans on seven occasions that prevented Iraq from hosting competitive international games.

Pre-2003

The first ban was imposed in 1980 after an Olympic qualifying play-off between Iraq and Kuwait in Baghdad, where the match referee was attacked by enraged home fans and members of the Iraqi team after the Malaysian official's decision to award a match-changing penalty to the Kuwaitis that led to Iraq losing 3–2. The ban was lifted in 1982.

Around the same time, the Iran–Iraq War started and the ban was imposed again. Iraq played their qualifying home games at a neutral venue and still qualified for the 1986 World Cup in Mexico, and three Olympic Games (Moscow, Los Angeles and Seoul). The ban was lifted in 1988, when the war ended.

When the Gulf War broke out in 1990, FIFA banned Iraq from hosting matches again until 1995. Iraq played at home at the 1998 World Cup qualifiers and 2002 World Cup qualifiers.

Post-2003

The Iraq War in 2003 forced Iraq to play their home matches outside the country for security reasons, and so home games were held at neutral venues for the 2006 World Cup qualifiers, 2007 Asian Cup qualifiers and 2010 World Cup qualifiers. In July 2009, Iraq played on home soil for the first time since the Iraq War, against Palestine in Erbil and Baghdad. The same month, the AFC Executive Committee approved the Franso Hariri Stadium as Iraq's venue for international matches and for clubs in continental tournaments.

On 23 July 2011, Iraq played a FIFA World Cup qualifier on home ground for the first time since 2001, defeating Yemen 2–0 at Franso Hariri Stadium in Erbil. However, FIFA re-imposed the ban on 23 September 2011 due to fears over security and a breach of safety regulations in the qualifying match with Jordan. Between 2013 and 2018, Iraq played various friendlies on home soil – in 2013 against Syria and Liberia in Baghdad, and in 2017 against Jordan, Kenya and Syria in Basra and Karbala. After successfully hosting these friendlies, on 16 March 2018, FIFA announced the lifting of the ban on competitive matches in the three cities. The 2018 AFC Cup Final was hosted in Basra, and in the summer of 2019, Iraq hosted the 2019 WAFF Championship.

However, following the outbreak of the 2019 Iraqi protests, FIFA once again imposed competitive home matches ban on Iraq. This meant that Iraq played the 2022 World Cup qualifiers at neutral venues.

The ban was briefly lifted before being re-imposed following the 2022 Erbil missile attacks. In 2023, Iraq hosted the 25th Arabian Gulf Cup, which was the first time they had hosted the tournament since 1979.

Results and fixtures

2022

2023

All-time results

Coaching staff
As of 6 November 2022.

Players

Current squad
The following 25 players were called up for the training camp from 20-28 March 2023, including the friendly match against Russia on 26 March 2023 in Saint Petersburg.

Caps and goals correct as of 19 January 2023, after the game against Oman

Recent call-ups
The following players have been called up within the last 12 months and remain eligible for selection.

SUS Player suspended
INJ Player injured
PRE Player was named in preliminary squad
RET Player retired from the national team
WD Player withdrew for non-injury related reasons

Records

.
Players in bold are still active with Iraq.

Most capped players

Top goalscorers

Competitive record

FIFA World Cup

AFC Asian Cup

FIFA Confederations Cup

Summer Olympics

Asian Games

Regional competitions

WAFF Championship

FIFA Arab Cup

Arabian Gulf Cup

West Asian Games

Pan Arab Games

Minor tournaments

Head-to-head record

The following table shows Iraq's all-time international record, correct as of 19 January 2023 (vs. ).

FIFA Rankings
 
Last update was on 18 February 2021
Source:

 Best Ranking   Worst Ranking   Best Mover   Worst Mover

Honours

Titles 
Continental competitions
AFC Asian Cup
 Champions (1): 2007
Asian Games
 Gold medal (1): 1982

Regional competitions
WAFF Championship
 Champions (1): 2002
Arab Cup
 Champions (4): 1964, 1966, 1985, 1988
Arabian Gulf Cup
 Champions (4): 1979, 1984, 1988, 2023
West Asian Games
 Gold medal (1): 2005
Pan Arab Games
 Gold medal (1): 1985

Awards 
AFC National Team of the Year: 2003, 2007
World Soccer Team of the Year: 2007

See also

 Iraq national under-23 football team
 Iraq national under-20 football team
 Iraq national under-17 football team

References

External links
 
Team profile – FIFA.com

 
AFC Asian Cup-winning countries
Asian national association football teams
Football in Iraq
National sports teams established in 1948